The nineteenth season of the American medical drama television series Grey's Anatomy was announced on January 10, 2022, by the American Broadcasting Company (ABC). It premiered on October 6, 2022, for the 2022–23 broadcast television season. Krista Vernoff returned for the season as executive producer and showrunner alongside her production company Trip the Light Productions. ABC Signature and Shondaland also co-produce the series. 

The season sees Ellen Pompeo, who portrays the titular character, reduce her involvement in the series. Richard Flood does not return from the previous season. Kate Walsh also appears in a recurring capacity. Jesse Williams and Greg Germann also return as guest stars. This is the first season to feature Alexis Floyd, Harry Shum Jr., Adelaide Kane, Midori Francis, and Niko Terho as series regulars.

Episodes

Cast and characters

Main

 Ellen Pompeo as Dr. Meredith Grey
 Chandra Wilson as Dr. Miranda Bailey
 James Pickens Jr. as Dr. Richard Webber
 Kevin McKidd as Dr. Owen Hunt
 Caterina Scorsone as Dr. Amelia Shepherd
 Camilla Luddington as Dr. Jo Wilson
 Kelly McCreary as Dr.  Maggie Pierce
 Kim Raver as Dr. Teddy Altman
 Jake Borelli as Dr. Levi Schmitt
 Chris Carmack as Dr. Atticus "Link" Lincoln
  Anthony Hill as Dr. Winston Ndugu 
 Alexis Floyd as Dr. Simone Griffith
 Harry Shum Jr. as Dr. Benson "Blue" Kwan
 Adelaide Kane as Dr. Jules Millin
 Midori Francis as Dr. Mika Yasuda 
 Niko Terho as Dr. Lucas Adams 
 Scott Speedman as Dr. Nick Marsh

Recurring

 Aniela Gumbs as Zola Grey Shepherd
 Jaicy Elliot as Dr. Taryn Helm

Notable guests
 Marla Gibbs as Joyce Ward
 Kate Walsh as Dr. Addison Montgomery
 Nolan Gould as Chase Sams
 Artemis Pebdani as Sharon Peters
 E.R. Fightmaster as Dr. Kai Bartley
 Jason George as Dr. Ben Warren
 Debbie Allen as Dr. Catherine Fox
 Jesse Williams as Dr. Jackson Avery
Greg Germann as Dr. Tom Koracick
 Jaina Lee Ortiz as Andrea "Andy" Herrera
 Boris Kodjoe as Robert Sullivan
 Stefania Spampinato as Dr. Carina DeLuca
 Carlos Miranda as Theo Ruiz

Production

Development
Krista Vernoff, who serves as the showrunner and an executive producer of Grey's Anatomy and spin-off Station 19 signed a two-year deal with ABC in 2021 to remain on both series through a potential nineteenth season. The deal also keeps Trip the Light Productions, Vernoff's production company, attached to the series. In December 2021 it was reported that negotiations for a renewal had begun between series star Ellen Pompeo, and production companies ABC Signature and Shondaland, the latter of which is run by series creator Shonda Rhimes. Network executives at ABC were interested in a nineteenth season due to its status as the longest-running primetime medical drama, high viewing figures, and profit generation. The season was officially renewed on January 10, 2022. As part of the renewal Pompeo received a promotion to executive producer, only previously being a co-executive producer. Betsy Beers, Debbie Allen, Meg Marinis and Mark Gordon also returned to executive produce. Zoanne Clack remained as the series' medical advisor and an executive producer, despite being hired as co-showrunner and executive producer on Station 19 alongside Vernoff.

Casting
Kim Raver, Camilla Luddington, and Kevin McKidd each signed a three-year contract in July 2020 keeping them attached to the series through a potential nineteenth season to portray Dr. Teddy Altman, Dr. Jo Wilson, and Dr. Owen Hunt, respectively. When the series was announced it was also reported that Pompeo signed a one-year deal to return as Dr. Meredith Grey. Chandra Wilson who portrays Dr. Miranda Bailey and James Pickens Jr. who portrays Dr. Richard Webber also signed multi-year contracts to continue on the series. Caterina Scorsone confirmed in a tweet that she would be returning for the season as Dr. Amelia Shepherd, stating that she was memorizing lines for the first episode. On August 3, 2022, it was announced that Pompeo would be scaling back her work on the series, only appearing  in a "limited capacity" in the first 7 episodes, as well as the season finale. Pompeo will only star in eight of the 20–23 episodes, but will continue to narrate most other episodes of the seasons. The reduction in involvement on the series comes from Pompeo's casting in a Hulu series based on Natalia Grace and her adoption by U.S. parents, on which she will also be an executive producer. The role is the first new fictional character for Pompeo since her casting as Grey in 2005.

In July 2022, five new actors were added to the main cast to portray new surgical residents. Alexis Floyd, who previously starred Inventing Anna, another Shondaland series; was the first of the five to be announced, and is set to play Simone Griffith. The character "never wanted to work at Grey Sloan because of a painful personal history with the hospital." Niko Terho was the next cast addition to be announced and will play Lucas Adams, a surgeon aiming to prove himself. Terho also starred in Inventing Anna and performed alongside Borelli in The Thing About Harry. Mika Yasuda, a middle child used to being overlooked, will be portrayed by Midori Francis. Adelaide Kane joined the cast as Jules Millin, who's "not afraid to break the rules to save a life." Harry Shum Jr. was the last of five to be announced and is expected to portray Daniel “Blue” Kwan. Kwan is reportedly "generous by nature but competitive to a fault." When a promo trailer was released on September 6, 2022, it was revealed that the last name of Floyd's character was changed to Griffith and the first name of Shum's character had been changed to Benson.

ABC later confirmed that Kelly McCreary, Anthony Hill, Chris Carmack, and Jake Borelli would also be returning to the main cast. Of this group, only McCreary's contract had expired, but was renewed. Scott Speedman, who joined as a series regular in the previous season with a one-year contract, was set to be demoted to the recurring cast, but continued to receive main billing. Richard Flood is the only member of the ensemble cast to not return after departing in the latter half of the eighteenth season. On September 7, 2022, it was revealed that Kate Walsh would reprise her role as Dr. Addison Montgomery in a recurring role. On October 17, 2022, it was announced that Jesse Williams would return as a director, and guest star in the fifth episode of the nineteenth season.

On March 17, 2023, it was reported that Kelly McCreary, who joined the series in the tenth series as Dr. Maggie Pierce, would be departing as a series regular following the currently unnamed fourteenth episode of the season airing on April 13, 2023. It was also announced she would be appearing in the final episode of the season, similar to Pompeo.

Release
When ABC revealed its fall schedule for the 2022–23 broadcast television season, it was reported that the season would hold its previous timeslot of Thursdays at 9:00pm Eastern Time (ET), serving as a lead-out of Station 19. The season premiere was later scheduled for October 6, 2022.

Reception

Ratings

References

Grey's Anatomy seasons
2022 American television seasons